NGC 7079 is a barred lenticular galaxy located about 110.58 million light-years away in the constellation of Grus. NGC 7079 is also classified as a LINER galaxy. It is tilted about 51° to the Earth's line of sight. NGC 7079 was discovered by astronomer John Herschel on September 6, 1834.

Physical characteristics 
NGC 7079 has a faint cigar-shaped bar with ansae at the ends, and there is another very faint spiral structure surrounding it. The rim of the disk also has a somewhat faint ring-like structure.

Emission of doubly ionized oxygen gas
In NGC 7079, it has been indicated that there is a faint emission of doubly ionized oxygen. The ionized gas is rotating in the opposite direction of the stars in the galaxy. The counter-rotation has been attributed to the accretion of gas from outside of the galaxy.

Group membership
NGC 7079 is a member of the NGC 7079 Group. The group, along with other nearby groups are part of the Pavo-Indus and Grus clouds of galaxies which form a connection between the Pavo–Indus and Virgo Superclusters. The other members of the NGC 7079 Group are NGC 7070, NGC 7070A, NGC 7097, NGC 7097A, ESO 287-37, ESO 287-39, ESO 287-41, and ESO 287-43.

See also 
 List of NGC objects (7001–7840)
 Lenticular galaxy
 NGC 936
 PGC 83677

References

External links 

Barred lenticular galaxies
LINER galaxies
Grus (constellation)
7079
66934
Astronomical objects discovered in 1834
NGC 7079 Group